() is a municipality and village in Frýdek-Místek District in the Moravian-Silesian Region of the Czech Republic. It has about 1,900 inhabitants.

Polish minority makes up 15.4% of the population.

Etymology
The name of the municipality is of topographic origins and literally means "sand". Historically it has been scribed as Piesek (1523), Pisek (1577, 1621), Pyßek/Pioßek (1643), Piasek (1652) and so on.

Geography
Písek lies in the historical region of Cieszyn Silesia, a small part of the municipality borders with Poland. The Olza River flows through the municipality.

The municipal territory is located on the border between two mountain ranges. The northern part lies in the Silesian Beskids, the southern part lies in the Jablunkov Intermontane.

History

Písek was established most probably in the 14th century. Historians presume that on the basis of establishment date of nearby Bukowiec (1353). The first written mention of Písek is in a document from 1466 where a local advocatus was mentioned. Politically Písek belonged initially to the Duchy of Teschen.

The villagers lived mainly off farming, pastoralism and forestry. In 1692, there was a mill. After the establishment of Třinec Iron and Steel Works in 1839 many inhabitants of Písek went to work there and agriculture has become a side activity for most of them.

After Revolutions of 1848 in the Austrian Empire a modern municipal division was introduced in the re-established Austrian Silesia. The village as a municipality was subscribed to the political district of Teschen and the legal district of Jablunkau. According to the censuses conducted in 1880–1910 the population of the municipality grew from 884 in 1880 to 1,055 in 1910 with a majority being native Polish-speakers (dropping from 100% in 1880 to 97.5% in 1910) accompanied by German-speaking (at most 2.5% in 1910) and Czech-speaking people (at most 1.1% in 1910). In terms of religion in 1910 the majority were Roman Catholics (59.5%), followed by Protestants (40.5%).

After World War I, Polish–Czechoslovak War and the division of Cieszyn Silesia in 1920, it became a part of Czechoslovakia. Following the Munich Agreement, in October 1938 together with the Zaolzie region it was annexed by Poland, administratively adjoined to Cieszyn County of Silesian Voivodeship. It was then annexed by Nazi Germany at the beginning of World War II. After the war it was restored to Czechoslovakia.

From 1980 to 1990 Písek was an administrative part of Jablunkov.

Transport
A road linking the Polish village of Istebna with Jablunkov runs through the municipality.

Sights
The Roman Catholic Church of Divine Mercy was built in 1995. The second church in the municipality is a SCEAV Lutheran church, built in 2010–2011.

Gallery

References

External links

 

Villages in Frýdek-Místek District
Cieszyn Silesia